1312 Vassar, provisional designation , is a carbonaceous Alauda asteroid from the outer region of the asteroid belt, approximately 30 kilometers in diameter. It was discovered on 27 July 1933, by Belgian–American astronomer George Van Biesbroeck at Yerkes Observatory in Wisconsin, United States. The asteroid was named for the American Vassar College.

Orbit and classification 

Vassar is a member of the Alauda family, a large family of typically bright carbonaceous asteroids and named after its parent body, 702 Alauda.

It orbits the Sun in the outer main-belt at a distance of 2.4–3.8 AU once every 5 years and 5 months (1,988 days). Its orbit has an eccentricity of 0.22 and an inclination of 22° with respect to the ecliptic. The body's observation arc begins with its official discovery observation at Yerkes in 1933.

Physical characteristics

Rotation period and pole 

In November 2011 American amateur astronomer David Higgins obtained a rotational lightcurve of Vassar from photometric observations taken at the Hunters Hill Observatory in Australia. It gave a well-defined rotation period of 7.932 hours with a brightness variation of 0.35 magnitude. In 2016, two modeled lightcurves were derived using data from the Lowell photometric database and other sources, giving a concurring period of 7.93189 and 7.93190 hours and a spin axis of (104.0°, −50°) and (251.0°, −23.0°) in ecliptic coordinates, respectively.

Diameter and albedo 

According to the surveys carried out by the Infrared Astronomical Satellite IRAS, the Japanese Akari satellite, and NASA's Wide-field Infrared Survey Explorer with its subsequent NEOWISE mission, Vassar measures between 27.56 and 36.28 kilometers in diameter, and its surface has an albedo between 0.064 and 0.09. The Collaborative Asteroid Lightcurve Link agrees with the results obtained by IRAS and derives an albedo of 0.0703 and a diameter of 36.32 kilometers with an absolute magnitude of 10.7.

Naming 

This minor planet was named by American astronomer Maud Worcester Makemson (1891–1977) after the U.S Vassar College (formerly: Vassar Female College), located in New York state. Makemson, who computed the asteroid's orbit, was a teacher at the private elite school and director of its Vassar College Observatory. Naming citation was first published in The Names of the Minor Planets by Paul Herget in 1955.

Notes

References

External links 
 Asteroid Lightcurve Database (LCDB), query form (info )
 Dictionary of Minor Planet Names, Google books
 Asteroids and comets rotation curves, CdR – Observatoire de Genève, Raoul Behrend
 Discovery Circumstances: Numbered Minor Planets (1)-(5000)  – Minor Planet Center
 
 

 

001312
Discoveries by George Van Biesbroeck
Named minor planets
Vassar College
19330727